FC Fakel-M Voronezh is a Russian football club based in Voronezh. It acts as the reserve-team for FC Fakel Voronezh.

History
The club mostly played on the amateur level since its founding. It played in the professional 1997 Russian Third League as Fakel-d Voronezh, but dropped out before the season was complete. For the 2020–21 season, it entered the third-tier Russian Professional Football League. Following Fakel's promotion to the Russian Premier League for the 2022–23 season, Fakel-M moved back to amateur levels as RPL holds its own Under-19 competition.

References

Association football clubs established in 1961
Football clubs in Russia
FC Fakel Voronezh
Sport in Voronezh
1961 establishments in Russia